The St Lite Kinen is a Japanese Grade 2 flat horse race in Japan for three-year-old Thoroughbred colts and fillies run over a distance of 2,200 metres at the Nakayama Racecourse, Funabashi, Chiba. The race is run in September and serves as the main trial race for the Kikuka Sho.

It was first run in 1947 and was named in honour of the Japanese Triple Crown St Lite. Among the winners of the race have been Symboli Rudolf, Legacy World and Nakayama Festa.

The race was run at Tokyo Racecourse from 1947 until 1956 and in 1966, 1968, 1974,  and 1976–1979. The 2014 running took place at Niigata Racecourse.

Winners since 1995

Earlier winners

 1947 - East Parade
 1948 - Kiyomasu
 1949 - Tosa Midori
 1950 - Wizard
 1951 - Mitsuhata
 1952 - Masamune
 1953 - Lucky Takayohi
 1954 - Homare O
 1955 - Takahagi
 1956 - Kitano O
 1957 - Seiyu
 1958 - Hishi Masaru
 1959 - Haku Kurama
 1960 - Kitano Oza
 1961 - Kenruko O
 1962 - Ryu Musashi
 1963 - Great Yoruka
 1964 - Umeno Chikara
 1965 - Kikuna Suzuran
 1966 - Hiro Isami
 1967 - Monta Son
 1968 - Asaka O
 1969 - Akane Tenryu
 1970 - Kurishiba
 1971 - Bel Wide
 1972 - Taiho Ciro
 1973 - Nuage Turf
 1974 - Suruga Sumpujo
 1975 - Ishino Arashi
 1976 - Nippo King
 1977 - Press Toko
 1978 - Sakura Shori
 1979 - Bingo Karoo
 1980 - Monte Prince
 1981 - Mejiro Titan
 1982 - Hospitality
 1983 - Mejiro Heine
 1984 - Symboli Rudolf
 1985 - Tiger Boy
 1986 - Legend Teio
 1987 - Merry Nice
 1988 - Daigo Sur
 1989 - Sakura Hokuto O
 1990 - White Stone
 1991 - Strong Kaiser
 1992 - Legacy World
 1993 - Rugger Champion
 1994 - Wind Fields

See also
 Horse racing in Japan
 List of Japanese flat horse races

References

Turf races in Japan